The Ochetoceratinae is a subfamily within the Oppeliidae from the Upper Jurassic, shells of which are typically oxycones with a tricarinate venter and falcoid ribbing, commonly divided by a median lateral groove or fillet. The median  (middle) keel is the tallest.

The Ochetoceratinae may be polyphyletic, derived from both the Oppeliidae and Hecticoceratinae as suggested by differences in the included genera.

Description 
The median lateral groove is well developed in Ochetoceras and Fehlmanites, less discernible in Cymaceras, but missing or difficult to make out in the other four.

References 

W.J. Arkell, et al. 1957  Mesozoic Ammonoidea. Treatise on Invertebrate Paleontology, Part L. Geological Society of America and University of Kansas Press.
D.T. Donovan, J.H. Callomon, and M.K. Howarth, 1981. Classification of the Jurassic Ammonitina.  The Systematica Association Special Volume no. 18. The Ammonoidea. Academic Press.

Ammonitida
Jurassic ammonites